Omar al-Tikriti (born ) is the son of Sabawi Ibrahim al-Tikriti and nephew of Saddam Hussein. He is a graduate of Baghdad College, in Baghdad, Iraq.

Biography
In July 2005, the United States Treasury Department blocked his assets, as well as those of his brothers Yasir Al-Tikriti, Ayman Al-Tikriti, Ibrahim Al-Tikriti, Bashar Al-Tikriti, and Sa’ad Al-Tikriti, in the United States due to his ties with the Ba'ath Party.

On 17 November 2005, Iraqi Attorney General Chathanfar Hmod Al-Jasim presented Interpol with an extradition request to bring Saddam Hussein's nephew from Yemen back to Baghdad to stand trial for “committing acts of terror".

References

External links
Treasury Department Blocks Assets of Saddam Hussein's Nephews
Boys of Baghdad College Vie for Prime Minister

1970 births
Living people
Tulfah family
Fugitives wanted on terrorism charges
Fugitives wanted by Iraq
Arab Socialist Ba'ath Party – Iraq Region politicians
Iraqi expatriates in Yemen